This is a list of hospitals in Illinois, sorted by name:

A
Advocate Children's Hospital, Park Ridge and Oak Lawn campuses
Advocate Christ Medical Center, Oak Lawn
Advocate Condell Medical Center, Libertyville
Advocate Good Samaritan Hospital, Downers Grove
Advocate Good Shepherd Hospital, Barrington
Advocate Illinois Masonic Medical Center, Chicago
Advocate Lutheran General Hospital, Park Ridge
Advocate Sherman Hospital, Elgin
Advocate South Suburban Hospital, Hazel Crest
Advocate Trinity Hospital, Chicago
Alexian Brothers Behavioral Health Hospital, Hoffman Estates
Alexian Brothers Medical Center, Elk Grove Village
Anderson Hospital, Maryville
Ascension Health Holy Family Medical Center, Des Plaines
Ascension Health Mercy Medical Center, Aurora
Ascension Health Rehabilitation Hospital in partnership with Shirley Ryan AbilityLab, Elk Grove Village
Ascension Health Resurrection Medical Center, Chicago
Ascension Health St. Alexius Medical Center, Hoffman Estates
Ascension Health Saint Francis Hospital, Evanston
Ascension Health Saint Joseph Hospital - Chicago, Chicago
Ascension Health Saint Joseph Hospital - Elgin, Elgin
Ascension Health Saint Joseph Medical Center, Joliet
Ascension Health Saints Mary and Elizabeth Medical Center Chicago–Saint Elizabeth Campus, Chicago
Ascension Health Saints Mary and Elizabeth Medical Center Chicago–Saint Mary Campus, Chicago
Ascension Health St. Mary's Hospital, Kankakee 
Ascension Health Women & Children's Hospital, Hoffman Estates
Community Memorial Hospital, Staunton

B
Alton Memorial Hospital, Alton
Memorial Hospital Belleville, Belleville
Memorial Hospital East, Shiloh
Blessing Health System
Blessing Hospital, Quincy
Illini Community Hospital, Pittsfield

C
Cancer Treatment Centers of America, Chicago
Cancer Treatment Centers of America, Downtown Chicago
Cancer Treatment Centers of America, Gurnee
Carle BroMenn Medical Center, Normal
Carle Eureka Hospital, Eureka
Carle Foundation Hospital, Urbana
Carle Richland Memorial Hospital, Olney
Hoopeston Community Memorial Hospital, Hoopeston
Carlinville Area Hospital, Carlinville
John H. Stroger, Jr. Hospital of Cook County, Chicago
Provident Hospital of Cook County, Chicago
Oak Forest Hospital of Cook County, Oak Forest 
CGH Medical Center, Sterling
Chicago Behavioral Hospital, Des Plaines
Chicago Lakeshore Hospital, Chicago
Community First Medical Center, Chicago
Crawford Memorial Hospital, Robinson
Sarah D. Culbertson Memorial Hospital, Rushville

D

E
Edward Hospital, Naperville

F
Fairfield Memorial Hospital, Fairfield
Fayette County Hospital, Vandalia
Ferrell Hospital, Eldorado
FHN Memorial Hospital, Freeport
Franciscan Health Chicago Heights, Chicago Heights
Franciscan Health Olympia Fields, Olympia Fields
Franklin Hospital, Benton

G
Garfield Park Behavioral Hospital, Chicago
Genesis Medical Center - Aledo, Aledo
Genesis Medical Center - Silvis, Silvis
Gibson Area Hospital, Gibson City

H
Hamilton Memorial Hospital, Mc Leansboro
Hammond-Henry Hospital, Geneseo
Hardin County General Hospital, Rosiclare
Harrisburg Medical Center, Harrisburg
Hartgrove Hospital, Chicago
Hillsboro Area Hospital, Hillsboro
Hopedale Hospital, Hopedale
Hospital Sisters Health System
Holy Family Hospital, Greenville
Holy Cross Hospital, Chicago
Good Shepherd Hospital, Shelbyville
Humboldt Park Health, formerly Norwegian American Hospital, Chicago

I
Alton Mental Health Center, Alton
Chester Mental Health Center, Chester
Chicago-Read Mental Health Center, Chicago
Choate Mental Health and Developmental Center, Anna
Elgin Mental Health Center, Elgin
Kankakee State Hospital, Kankakee
Mabley Developmental Center, Dixon
Madden Mental Health Center, Hines
McFarland Mental Health Center, Springfield
Insight Hospital & Medical Center, Chicago
Iroquois Memorial Hospital, Watseka

J
Jackson Park Hospital & Medical Center, Chicago
Jersey Community Hospital, Jerseyville

K
Katherine Shaw Bethea Hospital, Dixon
Kindred Chicago Central Hospital, Chicago
Kindred Hospital - Chicago, Chicago
Kindred Hospital - Northlake, Northlake
Kindred Hospital - Sycamore, Sycamore
Kindred Hospital Peoria, Peoria
Kirby Medical Center, Monticello

L
La Rabida Children's Hospital, Chicago
Lawrence County Memorial Hospital, Lawrenceville
Lincoln Prairie Behavioral Health Center, Springfield
Loretto Hospital, Chicago
Loyola Medicine
Gottlieb Memorial Hospital, Melrose Park
Loyola University Medical Center, Maywood
MacNeal Hospital, Berwyn
Ann & Robert H. Lurie Children’s Hospital of Chicago, Chicago

M
Marshall Browning Hospital, Du Quoin
Mason District Hospital, Havana
Massac Memorial Hospital, Metropolis
McDonough District Hospital, Macomb
Decatur Memorial Hospital, Decatur
Lincoln Memorial Hospital, Lincoln
Springfield Memorial Hospital, Springfield
Passavant Area Hospital, Jacksonville
Taylorville Memorial Hospital, Taylorville
Memorial Hospital of Carthage, Carthage
Memorial Hospital of Chester, Illinois, Chester
Javon Bea Hospital - Riverside, Rockford
Javon Bea Hospital - Rockton, Rockford
Mercyhealth Hospital and Medical Center - Harvard, Harvard
Midwest Medical Center, Galena
Morris Hospital and Health Care Centers, Morris
Morrison Community Hospital, Morrison
Mount Sinai Medical Center, Chicago

N
Edward Hospital, Naperville
Elmhurst Memorial Hospital, Elmhurst
Evanston Hospital, Evanston
Glenbrook Hospital, Glenview
Highland Park Hospital, Highland Park
Linden Oaks Hospital, Naperville
Northwest Community Hospital, Arlington Heights
Skokie Hospital, Skokie
Swedish Hospital, Chicago
Northwestern Medicine
Central DuPage Hospital, Winfield
Delnor Hospital, Geneva
Huntley Hospital, Huntley
Kishwaukee Hospital, DeKalb
Lake Forest Hospital, Lake Forest
Marianjoy Rehabilitation Hospital, Wheaton
McHenry Hospital, McHenry
Northwestern Memorial Hospital, Chicago
Palos Hospital, Palos Heights
Prentice Women's Hospital, Chicago
Valley West Hospital, Sandwich
Woodstock Hospital, Woodstock

O
Children's Hospital of Illinois, Peoria
OSF Heart of Mary Medical Center, Urbana
OSF Holy Family Medical Center, Monmouth
OSF Little Company of Mary Medical Center, Evergreen Park
OSF Sacred Heart Medical Center, Danville
OSF Saint Anthony Medical Center, Rockford
OSF Saint Anthony's Health Center, Alton
OSF Saint Clare Medical Center, Princeton
OSF Saint Elizabeth Medical Center, Ottawa
OSF Saint Francis Medical Center, Peoria
OSF Saint James Hospital, Pontiac
OSF St. Joseph Medical Center, Bloomington
OSF Saint Luke Medical Center, Kewanee
OSF St. Mary Medical Center, Galesburg
OSF Saint Paul Medical Center, Mendota

P
Pana Community Hospital, Pana
Paris Community Hospital, Paris
Pinckneyville Community Hospital, Pinckneyville
Pipeline Health
Louis A. Weiss Memorial Hospital, Chicago
West Suburban Medical Center, Oak Park

Q
Crossroads Community Hospital, Mt. Vernon
Galesburg Cottage Hospital, Galesburg
Gateway Regional Medical Center, Granite City
Heartland Regional Medical Center, Marion
Red Bud Regional Hospital, Red Bud
Union County Hospital, Anna
Vista Medical Center East, Waukegan
Vista Medical Center West, Waukegan

R
Riveredge Hospital, Forest Park
RML Specialty Hospital - Chicago, Chicago
RML Specialty Hospital - Hinsdale, Hinsdale
Rochelle Community Hospital, Rochelle
Roseland Community Hospital, Chicago
Riverside Medical Center, Kankakee
Rush Oak Park Hospital, Oak Park
Rush University Medical Center, Chicago
Rush–Copley Medical Center, Aurora
 Shirley Ryan AbilityLab, Chicago

S
Saint Anthony Hospital, Chicago
Saint Bernard Hospital, Chicago
Saint Anthony's Memorial Hospital, Effingham
Saint Elizabeth's Hospital, O'Fallon
Saint Francis Hospital, Litchfield
Saint John's Hospital, Springfield
Saint Joseph's Hospital - Breese, Breese
Saint Joseph's Hospital - Highland, Highland
Saint Margaret's Health - Peru, Peru
Saint Margaret's Health - Spring Valley, Spring Valley
Saint Mary's Hospital, Centralia
Saint Mary's Hospital, Decatur
Salem Township Hospital, Salem
Sarah Bush Lincoln Health Center, Mattoon
Shriners Hospital for Children - Chicago, Chicago
Silver Cross Hospital, New Lenox
Schwab Rehabilitation Center, Chicago
South Shore Hospital, Chicago
Southern Illinois Healthcare
SIH Herrin Hospital, Herrin
SIH Memorial Hospital of Carbondale, Carbondale
SIH Saint Joseph Memorial Hospital, Murphysboro
Sparta Community Hospital, Sparta
SSM Health Care
Clay County Hospital, Flora
Good Samaritan Hospital - Mt. Vernon, Mt. Vernon
Streamwood Hospital, Streamwood

T
The Pavilion Behavioral Health System, Champaign
Thomas H. Boyd Memorial Hospital, Carrollton
Thorek Memorial Hospital, Chicago
Thorek Memorial Hospital Andersonville, Andersonville
Touchette Regional Hospital, Centreville

U
UChicago Medicine AdventHealth Bolingbrook
UChicago Medicine AdventHealth GlenOaks
UChicago Medicine AdventHealth Hinsdale
UChicago Medicine AdventHealth LaGrange
Methodist Medical Center of Illinois, Peoria
Proctor Community Hospital, Peoria
Pekin Memorial Hospital, Pekin
Trinity Moline, Moline
Trinity Rock Island, Rock Island
The Center for Care and Discovery, Chicago
Bernard A. Mitchell Hospital, Chicago
Comer Children's Hospital, Chicago
Ingalls Memorial Hospital, Harvey
Children's Hospital University of Illinois (CHUI), Chicago
Illinois Eye and Ear Infirmary, Chicago
University of Illinois Hospital, Chicago
Captain James A. Lovell Federal Health Care Center, North Chicago
Edward Hines Jr. Veterans Administration Hospital, Hines
Jesse Brown VA Medical Center, Chicago
Marion Veterans Affairs Medical Center, Marion
Belvidere Medical Center, Belvidere
Swedish American Hospital, Rockford

V 
 Van Matre Encompass Health Rehabilitation Hospital, Rockford

W
Wabash General Hospital District, Mt. Carmel
Warner Hospital, Clinton
Washington County Hospital, Nashville

Defunct and/or Renamed
American Hospital, Chicago
Augustana Hospital, Chicago
Central Community Hospital, Chicago
Chicago Center Hospital, Chicago
Chicago Municipal Tuberculosis Sanitarium, Chicago
Chicago Union Hospital, Chicago
Children's Memorial Hospital, Chicago
Columbus Hospital, Chicago
Doctor's Hospital, Springfield
Doctor's Hospital of Hyde Park, Chicago
Douglas Park Hospital, Chicago
Edgewater Medical Center, Chicago
Englewood Hospital, Chicago
Fairbury Hospital, Fairbury
Forest Hospital, Des Plaines
Frank Cuneo Memorial Hospital, Chicago
Garfield Park Hospital, Chicago
Grant Hospital, Chicago
Hahnemann Hospital, Chicago
Henrotin Memorial Hospital, Chicago
HD Singer Hospital, Rockford
Jacksonville Developmental Center, Jacksonville
Jefferson Park Hospital, Chicago
John B. Murphy Hospital, Chicago
Lakeside Community Hospital, Chicago
Lewis Memorial Maternity Hospital, Chicago
Lincoln Park Hospital, Chicago
Lutheran Deaconess Hospital, Chicago
Manteno State Hospital, Manteno
Marine Hospital, Chicago
Martha Washington Hospital, Chicago
Mary Thompson Hospital for Women and Children, Chicago
Michael Reese Hospital, Chicago
MetroSouth Medical Center, Blue Island
Mound City Civil War Naval Hospital, Mound City
Neurologic & Orthopedic Hospital of Chicago, Chicago
North Chicago Hospital, Chicago
Passavant Hospital, Chicago
Peoria State Hospital, Bartonville
Prentice Women's Hospital Building, Chicago
Presbyterian Hospital, Chicago
Ravenswood Hospital, Chicago
Salvation Army Booth Hospital, Chicago
South Chicago Hospital, Chicago
St. Anne's Hospital, Chicago
St. Cabrini Hospital, Chicago
St. George Hospital, Chicago
St. Luke's Hospital, Chicago
Streeter Hospital, Chicago
Tabernacle Community Hospital and Health Center, Chicago
 Vibra Hospital of Springfield
Walther Memorial/University Hospital, Chicago
Washington Park Hospital, Chicago
Wesley Memorial Hospital, Chicago
Westlake Hospital, Melrose Park
West Side Hospital, Chicago
Woodlawn Hospital, Chicago

References

External links

Lists of buildings and structures in Illinois
Illinois